List of mountain peaks in the Greater Blue Mountains Area:

 Mount Boyce
 Mount Bindo
 Mount Trickett
 One Tree Hill
 Mount Piddington
 Mount York
 Mount Solitary
 Mount Banks
 Mount Stormbreaker
 Mount Hay, New South Wales
 Mount Cloudmaker
 Mount Wilson, New South Wales
 Mount Irvine
 Mount Tomah

 
New South Wales-related lists
Mountains, Blue